2002 Arab Unified Club Championship, known officially as the 2002 Prince Faisal bin Fahd Tournament for Arab Clubs, was the 18th UAFA Club Cup, and the 1st since the Arab Club Champions Cup and Arab Cup Winners' Cup were unified. The tournament was originally scheduled for 18 – 31 August 2002 in Morocco, hosted by MAS Fez. it was then postponed to 17 January – 2 February 2003, to be held in Fez and Casablanca, and finally moved to Jeddah.

Preliminary stage

Final stage
WA Casablanca enter as Moroccan club chosen by organisers in October, but could not enter the Jeddah tournament; they were replaced by Al-Ittihad Jeddah as second club of the host country.
Palestine representatives Al-Aqsa SC had to withdraw due to the Israeli government restricting the freedom of movement of Palestines in the occupied territories.

First round

Group 1

Group 2

Group 3

Group 4

Second round

Group A

Group B

Knock-out stage

Semifinals

Third place match

Third place match not played, Al-Ittihad awarded third place.

Final

Winners

References

External links
Prince Faysal bin Fahad Tournament for Arab Clubs 2003 (1st tournament) - rsssf.com

 
2002
2003